The pygmy elimia, scientific name †Elimia pygmaea, was a species of freshwater snail with a gill and an operculum, an aquatic gastropod mollusk in the family Pleuroceridae. This species was endemic to the United States. It is now extinct.

References 

Elimia
Extinct gastropods
Gastropods described in 1936
Taxonomy articles created by Polbot